Charles R. Earl (born June 6, 1946) is an American politician and former member of the Ohio House of Representatives 80th district from 1981 to 1984 when he declined to seek reelection. A member of the Libertarian Party, he received enough signatures to obtain ballot access and become a candidate for Governor of Ohio in the 2014 election.

Early life, education, and family
Earl was born in Fostoria, Ohio, a town near Findlay. Charlie attended public schools in Sycamore, Ohio and then enrolled at College of Wooster graduating in 1975 with a Bachelor of Arts in English. Later, Earl enrolled at Bowling Green State University graduating in 1992 with a Master of Arts in mass communication but stayed for two more years pursuing doctoral studies.

Ohio House of Representatives (1981–1984)
With Mike Oxley elected to Congress in a special election following the death of Congressman Tennyson Guyer, Earl was appointed to serve the remainder of Oxley's term in the Ohio House of Representatives. In 1982, Earl won election to a full term. In 1984, Earl opted not to run for another term, and was succeeded by Lynn Wachtmann. He subsequently returned to the private sector.

2010 Ohio Secretary of State election
In 2010, Earl decided to run for office, this time as a Libertarian.  While initially looking to obtain his seat back in the Ohio House of Representatives, he decided to instead run for Ohio Secretary of State. He lost the election, and has since again returned to private life.

2014 gubernatorial election
Earl has announced his candidacy for Governor of Ohio.
Earl has achieved enough valid signatures to obtain ballot access in the election. However, he was barred from the ballot because of technical faults in the signatures collected. The decision was appealed in federal court but the court determined the signatures were not collected by Libertarian Party or independent petitioners as required by law.

Electoral history

References

External links

 Campaign website
 Speeches and Interviews

1946 births
Living people
Republican Party members of the Ohio House of Representatives
Ohio Libertarians
People from Fostoria, Ohio
20th-century American politicians
Candidates in the 2010 United States elections
Candidates in the 2014 United States elections
Bowling Green State University alumni